Peter Maurice, D.D.   was a Chaplain to the King; and Dean of Bangor from 1727 until 1750.

Maurice was born in Cerrigydrudion and educated at Jesus College, Oxford. He was Vicar of Llanynys from 1718; and Treasurer of Bangor Cathedral from 1720 his appointment to the deanery. in 1740 he was appointed a Canon of Winchester.

He died in August 1759.

References

People from Denbighshire
Alumni of Jesus College, Oxford
18th-century Welsh Anglican priests
1759 deaths
Deans of Bangor
Honorary Chaplains to the King